Arja, also known as Balinese opera, is a popular form of Balinese theatre which combines elements of opera, dance, and drama. It was created in 1825 for the funeral of a Balinese prince. In the beginning it had an all-male cast; since the 20th century all performers (including those playing men) have been women.

The Panji tales are the most important plot material. Since the 20th century, Arja performances have also enacted Balinese mythology and legends as well as Indian (Mahabharata and Ramayana), Chinese, Arabic, and more recently, western and contemporary Indonesian stories.

Singing and stylized dance movements are accompanied by gamelan music played with two bamboo zithers called guntang.

See also

 Balinese theatre
 Balinese dance
 Balinese culture
 Theatre of Indonesia

References

Further reading
Coast, John . 1953. Dancers of Bali . New York : G.P. Putnam; reissued as Dancing Out of Bali, Periplus Editions, 2004. 
Dibia, I Wayan. 1992. Arja: A Sung Dance Drama of Bali: A Study of Change and Transformation. PhD dissertation, University of California, Los Angeles . 
Dibia, I Wayan and Rucina Ballinger. 2004. Balinese Dance, Drama, and Music. Singapore: Periplus. 
McPhee, Colin. 1966. Music in Bali. New Haven and London: Yale University Press. 
Zoete, Beryl de & Spies, Walter. 1973. Dance and Drama in Bali. Kuala Lumpur: Oxford University Press.

Theatre in Indonesia
Traditional drama and theatre of Indonesia
Dance in Indonesia
Balinese culture
Music of Bali
Ethnomusicology
Gamelan ensembles and genres